Geoffrey Loney (31 March 1894 – 7 April 1985) was an Australian cricketer. He played one first-class match for Tasmania in 1922/23.

See also
 List of Tasmanian representative cricketers

References

External links
 

1894 births
1985 deaths
Australian cricketers
Tasmania cricketers
Cricketers from Sydney